Toteil is a small village located at the southern edge of the Taka Mountains in Kassala state around 4.16 km from Kassala, Sudan. According to Lonely Planet Toteil is "noted for atmospheric cafes serving delicious coffee and popcorns in lovely surrounds". The historic Khatmiyah Mosque is 15–20-minute walk away.

References 

Sudan
Kassala (state)